The Littoral cusk (Monothrix polylepis) is a species of viviparous brotula known from shallow reefs off the coast of eastern Australia.  This species grows to a length of  SL.  This is currently the only known species in its genus.

References
 

Bythitidae
Monotypic fish genera
Fish described in 1897